Malta participated at the inaugural edition of the European Games in 2015. However, Malta was one of the eight nations that failed to win a medal at the inaugural European Games.

Medal Tables

Medals by Games

See also
 Malta at the Olympics

References